The 1908 United States presidential election in Utah was held on November 3, 1908, throughout all forty-six contemporary states as part of the 1908 United States presidential election. State voters chose three representatives, or electors to the Electoral College, who voted for president and vice president. This was the last election when Utah had the minimum three electoral votes as it would gain a second congressional district after the 1910 Census.

Background
Although Democrat/Populist Bryan had carried Utah in its debut presidential election by a five-to-one margin, the Republican Party – ditching ancestral hostility to the state's dominant Mormon religion – was soon able to take control of the state, despite a threat from the anti-Mormon "American Party" in urban areas with sizeable non-Mormon ("Gentile") populations. In its third election of 1904, the Beehive State had given a virtual two-to-one majority for Theodore Roosevelt against New York Democrat Alton B. Parker, who carried only Dixie's Washington County.

Believing that the election could only be won in the West and Midwest, Bryan – who had had no trouble winning a third Democratic nomination – chose Indiana's John Worth Kern as his running mate. However, although many in the media supported the election of Bryan and praised his policies, the rapid recovery from the "Panic of 1907" meant that Bryan struggled severely in the Progressive-minded Western States once campaigning began.

The antagonism towards Bryan of business meant that Taft had little trouble repeating Theodore Roosevelt's triumph of 1904, although Bryan was able to cut Alton Parker's losing margin from 29 to 17 percentage points. A powerful socialist movement in mining districts failed to equal Debs' support from the 1904 election as his policies were not considered feasible or were co-opted by the two major parties. Taft was further helped by the unseating of delegates for Bryan as a result of conflict between pro- and anti-Mormon factions.

Four years later, Utah would become one of the only two states that Taft would carry in his attempt for reelection, the other being Vermont.

Results

Results by county

See also
 United States presidential elections in Utah

Notes

References

1908 Utah elections
Utah
1908